Slonczewski is a surname. Notable people with the surname include:

 Joan Slonczewski (born 1956), American microbiologist
 John Slonczewski (1929–2019), American physicist